Hunt for the Wilderpeople is a 2016 New Zealand adventure comedy-drama film written and directed by Taika Waititi, whose screenplay was based on the book Wild Pork and Watercress by Barry Crump. Sam Neill and Julian Dennison play "Uncle" Hector and Ricky Baker; a father figure and foster son who become the targets of a manhunt after fleeing into the New Zealand bush. Carthew Neal, Leanne Saunders, Matt Noonan, and Waititi produced the film.

The film premiered at the 2016 Sundance Film Festival on 22 January 2016. The film opened across New Zealand on 31 March 2016. The film received a limited North American release on 24 June 2016.
The film received critical acclaim, with many critics highlighting Dennison and Neill's performances and chemistry.

Plot
Ricky Baker, a juvenile delinquent who was abandoned by his mother, is taken by child welfare services officer Paula and police officer Andy, to live in a remote farm with foster aunt Bella Faulkner and her husband, the cantankerous southern man Hector or Hec. Hec is remote, but Bella quickly manages to break through Ricky's defensive shell by taking him hunting and giving him a dog for his 13th birthday, which he names Tupac after his idol Tupac Shakur.

When Bella suddenly dies and Hec gets a letter that informs Ricky that child services will take him back, Ricky ineptly fakes his suicide by burning a barn and runs away into the bush with Tupac, where he is completely unable to cope and gets lost. Hec finds him easily, but breaks his ankle in a fall, forcing the two to camp for a period of time. The authorities meanwhile have found the house empty and the barn burnt down, and come to the conclusion that the bereaved and mentally unstable Hec has abducted Ricky. The impression is strengthened after Hec and Ricky encounter three foolish hunters (Joe, Ron, and Hugh) who get the idea that Hec is molesting Ricky. Hec reveals to Ricky that he has served prison time for manslaughter and is illiterate. Ricky, in turn, says his only friend in foster care has died and that his only options are risking the same fate in the foster system, or serving time in juvenile prison.  The pair agree to disappear into the bush.

A national manhunt ensues, and the two slowly bond while working together to escape arrest. Upon finding another hut, they encounter an unconscious, diabetic ranger. Hec decides to stay with the ranger and sends Ricky to find help. Ricky runs into a girl his age named Kahu, who takes him back to her house and introduces him to her dad. Ricky stays the night and returns the next morning to the hut where Hec was supposed to be. Ricky finds the place to be swarming with police, led by Paula and Andy. Ricky runs away. He later encounters Paula and Andy in the bush, separated by a ditch. Paula attempts to bribe Ricky, asking him to say that Hec was a sex offender. In return, she tells him that he will not ever go to juvenile prison. Ricky declines and runs away. Ricky catches up to Hec by remembering the survival strategies Hec taught him, and they continue their travels. They encounter a wild boar that mortally wounds Hec's dog Zag, forcing Hec to euthanize him. Ricky reveals he has been carrying Bella's ashes and originally planned to deliver them to "where the earth wets the cloak of the sky," as per her wishes. They bury Zag and scatter Bella's ashes into a remote waterfall high in a mountain range. Ricky and Hec find a man living out on his own called Psycho Sam. Sam lets them stay the night. After five months of surviving in the wilderness and several close calls, they are finally caught following a car and helicopter chase, and Ricky accidentally shoots Hec. Hec gets remanded and Ricky is taken in by Kahu's family.

After Hec's release from jail, Ricky seeks him out to apologize for the poor note their adventure ended on and to invite him to join Kahu's family, who he points out could use Hec's help around their farm. Hec agrees, and the two head out into the bush in search of a huia, an extinct bird they had re-discovered during their time on the run.

Cast

 Sam Neill as Hector Faulkner, Ricky's foster "uncle" and Bella's husband
 Julian Dennison as Ricky Baker, Hector and Bella's foster child
 Rima Te Wiata as Bella Faulkner, Ricky's foster "aunt" and Hector's wife
 Rachel House as Paula Hall, a child welfare worker
 Rhys Darby as Psycho Sam
 Oscar Kightley as Andy, a police officer
 Stan Walker as Ron
 Tioreore Ngatai-Melbourne as Kahu
 Troy Kingi as TK
 Mike Minogue as Joe
 Cohen Holloway as Hugh
 Taika Waititi as the Minister

Production 
Waititi first began to adapt the book Wild Pork and Watercress in 2005, and completed multiple different drafts. The early drafts stayed true to the book. However, later versions departed from it in several ways. Julian Dennison was cast by Waititi from earlier work they did together on a commercial.

The film had a budget of approximately NZ$4.5 million, of which $2 million came from the New Zealand Film Commission.

The film was shot over five weeks, in locations including the Central Plateau and the Waitākere Ranges. Almost the entire film was shot using a single camera.

Music 

The soundtrack was composed by Moniker and was released on 8 April 2016 by Majestical Pictures Ltd. All original songs were written and performed by Moniker unless specified.

Other soundtrack

 "Messa da Requiem: II. Dies Irae" by Hungarian State Opera Chorus (used only in trailer) 
 "Fraulein Love" by Space Waltz (used only in trailer) 
 "Magic (What She Do)" by DD Smash
 "Sinnerman" by Nina Simone
 "The Partisan" by Leonard Cohen
 "Shchedryk" by Choeur d'enfants du Bolchoï
 "Cadbury Flake jingle" arranged by Moniker
 "Turn Your Lights Down Low" arranged by Tioreore Ngatai-Melbourne
 "The Ole Rugged Cross" (un-credited)
 "Seabird" by Alessi Brothers (closing credits)

Release
The film premiered at the 2016 Sundance Film Festival on 22 January 2016 and was released in cinemas on 31 March 2016 in New Zealand by Piki Films and Madman Entertainment. The film was released on DVD and Blu-ray in America on 25 October 2016 by Sony Pictures Home Entertainment.

Reception

Box office
The film grossed NZ$1,263,000 in New Zealand on its opening weekend, the highest grossing opening weekend for a New Zealand film, ahead of What Becomes of the Broken Hearted?s $912,000 record in 1999. It has become the highest grossing New Zealand film, making over NZ$12 million.

Internationally, as of October 2016, the film has grossed A$10,935,319 in Australia, US$507,380 in the UK and US$5,137,201 in North America.

Critical response
On Rotten Tomatoes, Hunt for the Wilderpeople received a score of 97%, based on 201 reviews, with an average rating of 7.9/10. The site's critical consensus reads: "The charmingly offbeat Hunt for the Wilderpeople unites a solid cast, a talented filmmaker, and a poignant, funny, deeply affecting message." On Metacritic, the film has a score of 81 out of 100, based on 30 reviews, indicating "universal acclaim".

In his review, Hamish Popplestone remarked: "Though both flawed, Neill's and Dennison's characters are so, so charming on-screen and are fully apt at weaving through the dramatic, comedic, and sad points of the script." Empire magazine named Hunt for the Wilderpeople the number one film for 2016.

Explanatory notes

References

External links
 
 
 Hunt for the Wilderpeople at NZ on Screen
 
 
 

2010s New Zealand films
2016 films
2010s adventure comedy-drama films
2010s coming-of-age comedy-drama films
Films based on New Zealand novels
Films directed by Taika Waititi
Films with screenplays by Taika Waititi
Films produced by Taika Waititi
Films set in New Zealand
Films shot in New Zealand
New Zealand adventure films
New Zealand coming-of-age comedy-drama films
2016 comedy films
2016 independent films
2016 drama films
2010s English-language films
Films about hunters